Zollo is a surname. Notable people with the surname include:

Carmel Zollo (born 1952), Australian politician
Frederick Zollo (born 1953), American producer and director of both film and theatre
Paul Zollo (born  1958), American singer, songwriter, author, journalist and photographer

Italian-language surnames